Flyboard Air is a type of jetpack/hoverboard powered by gas turbines. It was invented by French water-craft rider Franky Zapata, founder of Zapata racing.

It also has 10 minutes' endurance. The "jet-powered hoverboard" is powered by five turbines and is fueled by kerosene.

Zapata participated in the 2019 Bastille Day military parade riding his invention. His attempt to cross the English Channel on 25 July 2019 failed as he fell into the sea at the refuelling platform. A second crossing attempt on 4 August 2019 succeeded. Escorted by French Army helicopters and using a backpack fuel reservoir, he accomplished the journey –  – with one refueling stop at the midpoint. Zapata reached a speed of  during the 20-minute flight. The trip started at Sangatte in the Pas-de-Calais department in France and concluded at St Margaret's at Cliffe in Kent, United Kingdom where he landed safely.

Zapata's company, Z-AIR, had received a €1.3 million grant from the French military. However, he has said that the flyboard was not yet ready for military use due to the noise it creates and the challenge of learning how to fly the device. In a France Inter radio interview, France's Minister of the Armed Forces Florence Parly said the flyboard might eventually be suitable, "for example as a flying logistical platform or, indeed, as an assault platform".

In 2017, Zapata had provided the U.S. Army with demonstrations of the Flyboard Air "jet-powered hoverboard" or "jet-powered personal aerial vehicle", referred to as the EZ-Fly; news reports suggested the price per unit might be $250,000. A July 2019 report provided no indication of any serious interest by the American military as of that time for this new technology.

On 4 August 2019, Zapata told BFM TV that he was working on building a flying car, that he hoped to introduce before year-end.

See also

 Hoverboard
 Flyboard, a hydroflight hoverboard hydrojetpack
 JetLev
 Jet pack

References

External links
 Video of Flyboard Air in operation

Jet pack
French inventions
Emerging technologies